Cactinae is a subtribe of cacti in the tribe Cacteae. It is notable to cactus-lovers, as it contains the large genus Mammillaria. They all produce globular (turning cylindrical) stems and most produce offshoots freely, although this may take some species up to 30 years. The tubercles are generally arranged in spirals. The principal genera of this subtribe are Coryphantha and Mammillaria.

Genera
Cochemiea
Coryphantha
Escobaria
Mammillaria
Mammilloydia
Pelecyphora

References 

 Micropropagation  of  Members  of  the  Cactaceae Subtribe Cactinae. Philip W. Clayton, John F. Hubstenberger, Gregory C. Phillips and S. Ann Butler-Nance, J. Am. Soc. Hort. Sci., 115(2), pages 337–343, 1990

External links 

Plant subtribes
Cactoideae